The  (also called , literally China-Ryukyu Border Trough ) is a seabed feature of the East China Sea. It is an active, initial back-arc rifting basin which has formed behind the Ryukyu arc-trench system in the West Pacific.  It developed where the Philippine Sea Plate is subducting under the Eurasia Plate.<ref>Thakur, Naresh Kumar et al. (2010). {{google books|iqL67NrCQloC|Exploration of Gas Hydrates: Geophysical Techniques, p. 119.|page=119}}</ref>

Description
It is a back-arc basin formed by extension within the continental lithosphere behind the far deeper Ryukyu Trench-arc system. The thickness of the crust in the northern Okinawa Trough is 30 km, thinning to 10 km in the southern Okinawa Trough.

The Okinawa Trough  still in an early stage of evolving from arc type to back-arc activity, and features volcanoes such as the Yonaguni Knoll IV.

Implications for the China–Japan maritime boundary

Interpretations

The existence of the Okinawa Trough complicates descriptive issues in the East China Sea. According to Professor Ji Guoxing of the Asia-Pacific Department at Shanghai Institute for International Studies,
 China's interpretation of the geography is that 
 Japan's interpretation of the geography is that 

 Legal Procedure 
On August 15, 2013, China's mission did a presentation to the Commission on the Limits of the Continental Shelf (CLCS) established under the United Nations Convention on the Law of the Sea (UNCLOS). The presentation was on the proposal that demarcates the limits of the outer continental shelf beyond 200 nm in part of the East China Sea. China states that China's continental shelf in the East China Sea extends to China-Ryukyu Border Trough naturally, which has been over 200 nautical miles away from the mainland baseline of Chinese territorial waters. According to UNCLOS, any country claiming continental shelves beyond 200 nm shall provide relevant scientific evidence to CLCS. To collect solid data, China deployed 14 scientific survey ships, covering an area of 250,000 square kilometers.

Notes

References
 Taylor, Brian. (1995). Backarc Basins: Tectonics and Magmatism. New York: Plenum Press. ;  OCLC 32464941
  Thakur, Naresh Kumar and Sanjeev Rajput. (2010). Exploration of Gas Hydrates: Geophysical Techniques.'' Berlin: Springer Verlag.  ;  OCLC 646113755

Geology of China
Geology of Japan
Geology of South Korea
Plate tectonics
Back-arc basins